Guy Richards Champlin (1785 - 1817) was the master of the Privateer General Armstrong from 1812 to 1814 and the privateer Warrior from 1814 to 1815. He was born on 5 August 1785, in New London, Connecticut, the youngest son of Mary (née Richards) and captain Lodowick Champlin. Guy's father had been a privateer during the American War of Independence.

Captain Guy R. Champlin was one of the American sailors most feared by the British, as he had a remarkable record of bold action, great bravery and fearless aggression.

In 1817, Commanding a 6-gun privateer schooner against Spanish vessels, he captured several slavers. Preparing to land several hundred slaves in the Atchafalaya River, he drowned when his boat swamped.

References

People from New London, Connecticut
American people of the War of 1812
1785 births
1817 deaths